John Petraglia Sr. (born March 3, 1947) is an American professional bowler. He is a member of the Professional Bowlers Association (PBA), where he won 14 PBA Tour titles. He has also won eight PBA Senior Tour titles. He is a member of both the PBA and USBC Halls of Fame.

Bowling career 
Petraglia joined the PBA in 1965, and won his first tour title at Fort Smith, Arkansas in 1966 when he was just 19 years old. A week later, Petraglia left the PBA Tour to join the United States Army during the Vietnam War. He served as an Army Specialist 5 in Long Binh and Bien Hoa from 1967 to 1968.

His best season as a pro came in 1971, when he won five titles in all. That year included consecutive wins in the last three tournaments of the winter season—culminated by a major championship in the Firestone Tournament of Champions. Petraglia remains the only PBA bowler to win three consecutive televised tournaments. Petraglia would win two more majors: the 1977 BPAA U.S. Open and 1980 PBA National Championship, making him at the time only the second player to earn the PBA career "triple crown", following Billy Hardwick. Since then, six other players (Mike Aulby, Pete Weber, Norm Duke, Chris Barnes, Jason Belmonte, and Dom Barrett) have also achieved the triple crown. The 1980 event featured one of the more dramatic final matches in major tournament history, as Petraglia rolled four consecutive strikes in the 9th and 10th frames to secure the victory over Gary Dickinson.

At the PBA National Championship 1994, the 47-year-old Petraglia rolled the PBA's seventh televised perfect 300 game to defeat Walter Ray Williams Jr., 300–194, in the semifinal match. He did not, however, go on to win the title match that followed. Through 2022, Petraglia is the oldest player to score 300 in a televised PBA Tour event.

Petraglia is one of only two bowlers (joining Dick Weber) to win at least one regular or Senior PBA Tour title in six different decades. However, Weber's final title was in a PBA Regional event. After his victory in the PBA Senior Dayton Classic on May 17, 2012, Petraglia is the only bowler in history to win a national PBA Tour title in six different decades.

In 2010, Petraglia won the Dick Weber Bowling Ambassador Award, an honor given annually by the Bowling Proprietors Association of America (BPAA) to the "bowling athlete who has consistently shown grace on and off the lanes by promoting the sport of bowling in a positive manner."

In the qualifying rounds of the 2018 PBA Tournament of Champions, Petraglia announced his retirement from the PBA Tour. However, he is still a brand ambassador for Brunswick and occasionally competes in the PBA50 Tour (formerly PBA Senior Tour).

PBA Tour titles
Major championships in bold type.
 1966 Fort Smith Open (Fort Smith, Arkansas)
 1970 Bellows-Valvair Open (Pittsburgh, Pennsylvania)
 1971 Winston-Salem Classic (Winston-Salem, North Carolina)
 1971 Fair Lanes Open (Springfield, Virginia)
 1971 Don Carter Classic (New Orleans, Louisiana)
 1971 Firestone Tournament of Champions (Akron, Ohio)
 1971 Houston-Sertoma Open (Houston, Texas)
 1972 Bellows-Valvair Open (Painesville, Ohio)
 1974 Brunswick World Open (Glendale Heights, Illinois)
 1977 BPAA U.S. Open (Greensboro, North Carolina)
 1978 Long Island Open (Garden City, New York)
 1979 Miller High Life Open (Milwaukee, Wisconsin)
 1979 Midas Golden Challenge (Palatine, Illinois)
 1980 PBA National Championship (Sterling Heights, Michigan)

Personal
Born in Brooklyn, New York, he now hails from Jackson Township, New Jersey. Starting in 1980, Petraglia had been a resident of Manalapan Township, New Jersey for more than three decades.

In the media
In a sport where most bowlers frequently change equipment affiliations, Petraglia has remained associated with Brunswick Corporation since 1971. Numerous Brunswick bowling balls and other products have borne his name over the years, including the popular "Johnny Petraglia LT-48" ball from the late 1970s and 1980s that was brought back in a reactive form in recent years. There was also a recent PBA Tour stop named after him—The Johnny Petraglia Open in North Brunswick, NJ.

Awards and recognition
 Inducted into the PBA Hall of Fame in 1982
 Inducted into USBC Hall of Fame in May 2009
 Served three terms as PBA President (1979–80, 1989–90 and 1997–98)
 Was ranked #16 on the PBA's 2008 list of "50 Greatest Players of the Last 50 Years"
 One of eight players in history to earn the PBA career Triple Crown
 Only player to win three consecutive televised PBA Tour events (1971)
 Oldest player to roll a nationally televised 300 game in a PBA Tour event (1994, age 47)
 2010 BPAA Dick Weber Bowling Ambassador award winner

Oil Pattern 
The PBA introduced an oil pattern, "The Johnny Petraglia 46" named after the bowler.

References

1947 births
Living people
American ten-pin bowling players
United States Army personnel of the Vietnam War
Bowling broadcasters
People from Manalapan Township, New Jersey
Sportspeople from Brooklyn
Sportspeople from Jackson Township, New Jersey
Sportspeople from Staten Island